City of Sheffield & Dearne Athletic Club is an athletics club based in Sheffield, England.  It is based at the Sheffield Hallam University City Athletics Stadium. The club competes in the British Athletics League Premiership and Northern Athletics League Division 1. The Young Athletes compete in the National Youth Development League. The Upper and Lower Age Group teams compete in the Northern East Premier Division.

From 2017 the club have joined the UK Women's League.

History
Sheffield United Harriers were formed in 1894.  In 1975, Sheffield United Harriers amalgamated with Sheffield City Athletic Club to form Sheffield Athletic Club.

At the turn of the century the club assumed the name City of Sheffield Athletic Club. The club competed at the Don Valley Stadium until it closed in September 2013, moving to Sheffield Hallam University City Athletics Stadium after refurbishments.

In 2015 the club completed the merger with Dearne Athletic Club founded by Trevor Fox and competes under the name of City of Sheffield & Dearne Athletic Club.

Honours

Senior Men:
 British Athletics League
 Second Place: 2015 
 Third Place: 2013, 2014

Young Athletes: 
 Youth Development League
 Fifth Place: 2015

Notable athletes

Olympians

Luke Cutts

Gerald Phiri

Rafael Alleyne

Rafi Solaiman (Para Athlete)  RaceRunner. RR3 100m Silver Medalist - Para Athletics European Championships, Berlin 2018. RR3 100m Silver Medalist - World Para Athletics Championships, Dubai 2019.

Ellie Simpson (Para Athlete)  RaceRunner. RR2/3 Silver Medalist - World Para Athletics Championships, Dubai 2019. 200m World Record Holder 2019-2020

Kit 
The club's vest consists of a thick blue stripe on the front and back in the centre, with dark green sides.

References

External links
 Official club website 
 Sheffield Hallam University City Athletics Stadium

Sports clubs established in 1876
Athletics clubs in England
Sports teams and clubs in Sheffield
1876 establishments in England